2 Fast 4 Gnomz is an action adventure platform video game developed and published by Polish studio QubicGames in North America and Europe, with Flyhigh Works publishing it in Japan. It was released on the WiiWare for Wii in 2012, and for the eShop for the Nintendo 3DS in late 2012 to early 2013.

Gameplay 
The user plays as Bumb, a gnome who has to save a princess, and has to complete various platform-style levels. While traversing the game, players can collect socks found throughout the levels. The controller's D-pad is used to change movement style, from slamming into trees to speeding up or reversing time. The game takes places in different settings, mainly in the forest. However, after completing initial 40 levels, in the Wii version, players get to play a new set of 40 levels taking place at night, which are more difficult and utilizes all 4 skills learned throughout the game, alongside having Bumb running to the left instead of the right. In the 3DS version, after completing the initial 40 levels, players are taken to "The Nightmare", in which certain criteria needs to be met in order to progress. The first 4 levels of this section require players to obtain 80 stars, a mechanic exclusive to the 3DS version, from the four worlds (stylized as worlds I, II, III, and IV. "Collect at least 80 stars from the (I-st/II-nd/III-rd/IV-thsic) world.") respectively to be unlocked, and the fifth level requiring 26 stars from the initial 4 levels ("Collect at least 26 stars from other nightmares.") of this section to be unlocked. The Wii version contains 80 levels, while the 3DS version contains only 45 levels, with a total of 405 stars to be earned through the number of socks collected, time taken to reach the finish (unlocked by completing World II-10 (2–10), which unlocks the speed ability), and the number of deaths.

Both versions of the game have demos, though both differ in what levels players get to experience. The WiiWare version lets players play the first 10 levels, while the 3DS demo only lets players play 5 levels out of World I, and 2 levels out of World II, totaling to 7 levels.

Reception 
The 3DS version of the game holds a score of 65/100 on review aggregator Metacritic indicating "mixed or average" reviews.

References 

2012 video games
Flyhigh Works games
Nintendo 3DS eShop games
Platform games
QubicGames games
Single-player video games
Video games developed in Poland
WiiWare games